Anthony Tillmon Williams (December 12, 1945 – February 23, 1997) was an American jazz drummer.

Williams first gained fame as a member of Miles Davis' "Second Great Quintet", and later pioneered jazz fusion with Davis' group and his own combo, the Tony Williams Lifetime. In 1970, music critic Robert Christgau described him as "probably the best drummer in the world". Williams was inducted into the Modern Drummer Hall of Fame in 1986.

Life and career

Williams was born in Chicago and grew up in Boston. He was of African, Portuguese, and Chinese descent. He studied with drummer Alan Dawson at the age of 11, and began playing professionally at the age of 13 with saxophonist Sam Rivers. Saxophonist Jackie McLean hired Williams when he was 16.

At 17 in 1963 Williams gained attention by joining Miles Davis in what was later dubbed Davis's Second Great Quintet. Williams was a vital element of the group, called by Davis in his autobiography "the center that the group's sound revolved around." His playing helped redefine the role of the jazz rhythm section through the use of polyrhythms and metric modulation. Meanwhile, he recorded his first two albums as leader for Blue Note label, Life Time (1964) and Spring (1965). He also recorded as a sideman for the label including, in 1964, Out to Lunch! with Eric Dolphy and Point of Departure with Andrew Hill.

In 1969, he formed a trio, the Tony Williams Lifetime, with John McLaughlin on guitar and Larry Young on organ. Lifetime was a pioneering band of the fusion movement.

Their first album was Emergency!. After the departures of McLaughlin and bassist Jack Bruce, who had joined the group for its second album, and several more releases, Lifetime disbanded. In 1975, Williams put together a band he called "The New Tony Williams Lifetime", featuring bassist Tony Newton, pianist Alan Pasqua, and English guitarist Allan Holdsworth, which recorded two albums for Columbia Records, Believe It and Million Dollar Legs.

In mid-1976, Williams was a part of a reunion with his colleagues from the Miles Davis band: keyboardist Herbie Hancock, bassist Ron Carter, and saxophonist Wayne Shorter. Davis was in the midst of a six-year hiatus and was "replaced" by Freddie Hubbard. The record was later released as V.S.O.P. The group toured for several years and a series of live albums were released under the name "V.S.O.P." or "V.S.O.P.: The Quintet".

In 1979, Williams, McLaughlin and bassist Jaco Pastorius united for a one-time performance at the Havana Jazz Festival. This trio came to be known as the Trio of Doom, and a recording of their performance (along with some studio tracks recorded in New York shortly thereafter) was released in 2007. It opens with a powerful drum improvisation by Williams, followed by McLaughlin's "Dark Prince" and Pastorius' "Continuum", Williams's original composition "Para Oriente" and McLaughlin's "Are You the One?" Williams and Pastorius had also played together on the Herbie Hancock track "Good Question" from his 1978 album Sunlight. With the group Fuse One, Williams released an album in 1980.

In 1985, he returned to Blue Note and the result was a series of recordings for the label beginning with Foreign Intrigue, which featured the playing of pianist Mulgrew Miller and trumpeter Wallace Roney. Later that year he formed a quintet with Miller, Roney, saxophonist Bill Pierce, and bassist Charnett Moffett (later Ira Coleman). This band played Williams's compositions almost exclusively. Williams also played drums for the band Public Image Limited, fronted by John Lydon (a.k.a. Johnny Rotten of the Sex Pistols), on their release Album/Cassette/Compact Disc (1986, the album title varied depending on the format). He played on the songs "FFF", "Rise" (a modest hit), and "Home". Bass guitarist Bill Laswell co-wrote those three songs with Lydon. The other drummer on that album was Ginger Baker.

On February 20, 1997, Williams checked into Seton Medical Center in Daly City, California, suffering from stomach pain. Three days later, while recuperating from gall bladder surgery, he died of a heart attack. Williams was 51 years old.

Personal life
Williams lived and taught in the San Francisco Bay Area until his death from a heart attack following routine gallbladder surgery. One of his final recordings was The Last Wave by the trio known as Arcana, a release organized by Bill Laswell.

Discography

As leader/co-leader 

 Life Time (Blue Note, 1964)
 Spring (Blue Note, 1966) – recorded in 1965
 Emergency! (Verve, 1969)
 Turn It Over (Verve, 1970)
 Ego (Polydor, 1971)
 The Old Bum's Rush (Polydor, 1972)
 Believe It (Columbia, 1975)
 Million Dollar Legs (Columbia, 1976)
 The Joy of Flying (Columbia, 1979)
 Play or Die with Tom Grant and Patrick O'Hearn (P.S. Productions, 1980)
 Foreign Intrigue (Blue Note, 1985)
 Civilization (Blue Note, 1987) – recorded in 1986
 Angel Street (Blue Note, 1988)
 Native Heart (Blue Note, 1990) – recorded in 1989
 The Story of Neptune (Blue Note, 1992) – recorded in 1991
 Tokyo Live (Blue Note, 1993)[2CD] – live recorded in 1992
  A Tribute to Miles with Herbie Hancock, Wayne Shorter, Ron Carter, Wallace Roney (Qwest/Reprise/Warner Bros., 1994)
 Wilderness (Ark 21, 1996) – recorded in 1995
 Young at Heart (Columbia, 1996)

Compilation
  Lifetime: The Collection (Columbia, 1992)[2CD] – combined  Believe It (1975) and Million Dollar Legs (1976)

Posthumous releases
 Live at The Village Gate (Hi Hat, 2017) – live recorded in 1976
 Live Tokyo 1978 (Hi Hat, 2018) – live recorded in 1978

As group 

The Great Jazz Trio
With Hank Jones and Ron Carter
 I'm Old Fashioned (East Wind, 1976) with Sadao Watanabe
 Love for Sale (East Wind, 1976)
 The Great Jazz Trio at the Village Vanguard (East Wind, 1977)
 The Great Jazz Trio at the Village Vanguard Vol. 2 (East Wind, 1977)
 Kindness Joy Love & Happiness (East Wind, 1977)
 Bird of Paradise (Flying Disk, 1977) with Sadao Watanabe
 Milestones (East Wind, 1978)
 New Wine in Old Bottles (East Wind, 1978) with Jackie McLean
 Direct from L.A. (East Wind, 1978)
 Carnaval (Galaxy, 1978) with Sadao Watanabe
 The Great Tokyo Meeting (East Wind, 1978)
 The Great Jazz Trio at the Village Vanguard Again (East Wind, 2000) – recorded in 1977. posthumous release.

Trio of Doom
With Jaco Pastorius and John McLaughlin
 Trio of Doom (Columbia Legacy, 2007) – recorded in 1979. posthumous release.

Arcana
With Derek Bailey and Bill Laswell 
The Last Wave (DIW, 1996) – recorded in 1995
 Arc of the Testimony also with Pharoah Sanders (Axiom/Island, 1997) – posthumous release

As sideman 

With Chet Baker
You Can't Go Home Again (Horizon, 1977) 
Chet Baker / Wolfgang Lackerschmid (Sandra Music Productions, 1980) with Wolfgang Lackerschmid – recorded in 1979
The Best Thing for You (A&M, 1989) – recorded in 1977

With Ron Carter
 Third Plane (Milestone, 1978)
 1 + 3 (JVC, 1979) – live recorded in 1978
Parade (Milestone, 1980) – recorded in 1979
 Carnaval (Galaxy, 1983) – live recorded in 1978
Etudes (Elektra/Musician, 1983) – recorded in 1982

With Miles Davis
 Seven Steps to Heaven (Columbia, 1963)
 Miles Davis in Europe (Columbia, 1963)
 Four & More (Columbia, 1964)
 My Funny Valentine (Columbia, 1964)
 Miles in Berlin (CBS, 1964)
 E.S.P. (Columbia, 1965)
 Miles Smiles (Columbia, 1966)
 Sorcerer (Columbia, 1967)
 Nefertiti (Columbia, 1967)
 Miles in the Sky (Columbia, 1968)
 Filles de Kilimanjaro (Columbia, 1968)
 Miles in Tokyo (CBS/Sony, 1969) – recorded in 1964
 In a Silent Way (Columbia, 1969)
 Water Babies (Columbia, 1976) – recorded in 1967-68
 Circle in the Round (Columbia, 1979) – recorded in 1967-68
 Directions (Columbia, 1981) – recorded in 1967-68
 The Complete Live at the Plugged Nickel 1965 (Columbia Legacy, 1995) – recorded in 1965
 Miles Davis & Gil Evans: The Complete Columbia Studio Recordings – four takes of "Falling Water" (Columbia Legacy, 1996) – recorded in 1968
 Live in Europe 1967: The Bootleg Series Vol. 1 (Columbia Legacy, 2012)
Miles Davis at Newport 1955-1975: The Bootleg Series Vol. 4 (Columbia Legacy, 2015)

With Tommy Flanagan
 The Master Trio (Baybridge, 1983)
 Blues in the Closet (Baybridge, 1983)

With Herbie Hancock
 My Point of View (Blue Note, 1963)
 Empyrean Isles (Blue Note, 1964)
 Maiden Voyage (Blue Note, 1965)
 V.S.O.P. (Columbia, 1977) – recorded in 1976
 V.S.O.P.: The Quintet (Columbia, 1977)
 V.S.O.P.: Tempest in the Colosseum (CBS/Sony, 1977)
 Herbie Hancock Trio (CBS/Sony, 1977)
 Sunlight (Columbia, 1978)
 V.S.O.P.: Live Under the Sky (CBS/Sony, 1979)
 Mr. Hands (Columbia, 1980)
 Herbie Hancock Trio (Columbia, 1982) – recorded in 1981
 Quartet (CBS/Sony, 1982)
 One Night with Blue Note Preserved (Blue Note, 1985)
 Round Midnight (soundtrack) (Columbia, 1986) – recorded in 1985
 Future 2 Future (Transparent Music, 2001)

With Jackie McLean
 One Step Beyond (Blue Note, 1964) – recorded in 1963
 Vertigo (Blue Note, 1980) – recorded in 1959-63

With Grachan Moncur III
 Evolution (Blue Note, 1964) – recorded in 1963
 Some Other Stuff (Blue Note, 1965) – recorded in 1964

With Sonny Rollins
 Easy Living (Milestone, 1977)
 Don't Stop the Carnival (Milestone, 1978)
 No Problem (Milestone, 1981)

With McCoy Tyner
 Supertrios (Milestone, 1977)
 Passion Dance (Milestone, 1978)
 Counterpoints (Milestone, 2004) – recorded in 1978

With others
 Geri Allen, Twenty One (Blue Note, 1994)
 George Cables, Phantom of the City (Contemporary, 1985)
 Stanley Clarke, Stanley Clarke (Nemperor, 1974)
 Eric Dolphy, Out to Lunch! (Blue Note, 1964)
 Kenny Dorham, Una Mas (Blue Note, 1963)
 Gil Evans, There Comes a Time (RCA, 1976) – recorded in 1975
 Hal Galper, Now Hear This (Enja, 1977)
 Stan Getz, Captain Marvel (Columbia, 1972)
 Dexter Gordon, The Other Side of Round Midnight (Blue Note, 1986) – recorded in 1985
 Jonas Hellborg and the Soldier String Quartet, The Word (Axiom, 1991)
 Joe Henderson, Relaxin' at Camarillo (Contemporary, 1981) – recorded in 1979
 Andrew Hill, Point of Departure (Blue Note, 1965) – recorded in 1964
 Terumasa Hino, May Dance (Flying Disk, 1977)
 Allan Holdsworth, Atavachron – Looking Glass (Enigma, 1986)
 Charles Lloyd, Of Course, Of Course (Columbia, 1965)
 Michael Mantler, Movies (Watt, 1978)
 Ray Manzarek, The Golden Scarab (Mercury, 1973)
 Branford Marsalis, Renaissance (Columbia, 1987)
 Wynton Marsalis, Wynton Marsalis (Columbia, 1981)
 John McLaughlin, Electric Guitarist (Columbia, 1978)
 Marcus Miller, The Sun Don't Lie (PRA, 1993)
 Mulgrew Miller, The Countdown (Landmark, 1989) – recorded in 1988
 Yoko Ono, Starpeace (PolyGram, 1985)
 Michel Petrucciani, Marvellous (Dreyfus, 1994)
 Pop Workshop, Song For The Pterodactyl (Grammofonverket, 1974)
 Public Image Limited, Album (Virgin, 1985)
 Don Pullen, New Beginnings (Blue Note, 1988)
 Sam Rivers, Fuchsia Swing Song (Blue Note, 1964)
 Wallace Roney, Verses (Muse, 1987)
 Carlos Santana,The Swing of Delight (Columbia, 1980)
 Travis Shook, Travis Shook (Columbia, 1993)
 Wayne Shorter, The Soothsayer (Blue Note, 1979) – recorded in 1965
 Weather Report, Mr. Gone  (Columbia, 1978)

References

Bibliography
 Colin_Larkin (ed.) (1992) The Guinness Encyclopedia of Popular Music, 1st ed., pg. 2699; 
 Thom Holmes (2006) American Popular Music: Jazz, pg. 216'';

External links

1945 births
1997 deaths
20th-century American drummers
African-American jazz musicians
American jazz drummers
American male drummers
American musicians of Chinese descent
American people of Portuguese descent
Arcana (American band) members
Blue Note Records artists
Grammy Award winners
Hard bop drummers
Jazz fusion drummers
Jazz musicians from Illinois
Jazz musicians from Massachusetts
American male jazz musicians
Miles Davis Quintet members
Musicians from Boston
Musicians from Chicago
Post-bop drummers
The Tony Williams Lifetime members
Trio of Doom members
V.S.O.P. (group) members
20th-century American male musicians
Modal jazz drummers
African-American drummers